Peter Njoka was the Anglican bishop of Nairobi in  Kenya: his name was linked to a corruption scandal.

References

21st-century Anglican bishops of the Anglican Church of Kenya
Anglican bishops of Nairobi
Living people
Year of birth missing (living people)
Place of birth missing (living people)